Johannes Hancke  (also Jan Hancke; Joannes Hancke; 2 February 1644 – 24 August 1713) was a German Jesuit theology professor and mathematician.

John Hancke was born in Neisse, and joined the Jesuit order in 1664. After his novitiate in Brno, he studied theology from 1670 to 1674 at the universities of Breslau and Prague and he published his Theses Mathematicae in 1676. He taught Mathematics and Theology in Prague and at the Palacký University of Olomouc and the University of  Breslau.  He died, aged 69, in Brno.

Works 
 Positiones ex universa theologie scholastice. 1672
 Genesis montium propositionibus physico-mathematici illustrata. 1680
 Tenebrae summatim illustratae sive doctrina eclipsium … Christophorus Küchler, Mainz 1682
 Praedictio astronomica solaris deliquii ad annum 1684. 1683
 Horologium nocturnum magneticum. 1683
 with Kaspar Neumann: Exercitatio catoptrica de idolo speculi. Baumann, Breslau 1685
 Litera de cogitata et Romae agitata reformatione calendarii Gregoriani. 1702

External links and references 
 www.phil.muni.cz
 navarikp.sweb.cz 

1644 births
1713 deaths
17th-century German mathematicians
18th-century German Jesuits
17th-century German Catholic theologians
German male non-fiction writers
17th-century German Jesuits
18th-century German mathematicians